The 2019–20 season is Bashundhara Kings's 3rd professional season since its creation in 2013, and its second consecutive season in the top-flight of Bangladesh football. The season began on 13 February 2020 and was suspended on 15 March 2020, due to the COVID-19 pandemic in the Bangladesh. On 17 May 2020, the league was declared void by the BFF executive committee.

Summary
On 3 September 2019, Kings took another step in their bid to bolster their star-studded squad for the upcoming season by completing the signing of rising Lebanon International striker Mohamed Jalal Kdouh.
On 22 October 2019, Gokulam Kerala FC of India made a flying start in the eight-team 2019 Sheikh Kamal International Club Cup upsetting Kings by 3-1 goals in their first match. On 24 October 2019, Bashundhara Kings clinched their first win of the Sheikh Kamal International Club Cup after beating nine-man Chennai City FC 3–2 in an eventful encounter where four red cards were splashed on and off the pitch, including the head coaches of the two teams. On 26 October 2019, Bashundhara Kings were ruled out of the tournament after losing to Terengganu FC 4–2 in their must-win match of the final group round fixtures.

On 7 November 2019, it was revealed that Kings signed Bangladesh-origin Finland right-back Tariq Kazi to bolster their defense for the upcoming season.

On 19 December 2019, Bashundhara Kings began their TVS Federation Cup 2019 campaign with a 1–0 win over Brothers Union. New signing Lebanese striker Mohamed Jalal Kdouh netted the all-important goal in the opening half. On 3 January 2020,  Kings reached the final of Bangladesh Federation Cup  eliminating newcomers Bangladesh Police FC by 3-0 goals in the second semifinal. On 5 January 2020, Daniel Colindres scored twice as Bashundhara Kings clinched the title of the Federation Cup for the first time following a 2–1 win over Rahmatganj MFS in the final. The achievement also ensured Bashundhara's play-off berth in next season's AFC Cup. Daniel Colindres was named player of the tournament.

On 2 February 2020, it was revealed that Former Argentina international Hernan Barcos will be playing for Bangladesh Premier League champions Bashundhara Kings in their upcoming AFC Cup campaign and the second phase of the league, confirmed club president Imrul Hassan.

On 13 February 2020, Defending champions Bashundhara Kings managed a hard-fought 1-0 goal victory over newcomers Uttar Baridhara Club in the opening match of the Bangladesh Premier League (BPL) at their home venue at Sheikh Kamal Stadium in Nilphamari.

On 11 March 2020, Argentine striker Hernan Barcos made a remarkable debut in Bangladesh with a sensational quadruple as Bashundhara Kings kicked off their maiden 2020 AFC Cup campaign from Group E with a dominating 5–1 win over TC Sports Club. Barcos, who featured for Argentina four times, headed his first two goals within half an hour before netting two more after the break, while skipper Daniel Colindres added the other to record Bashundhara's biggest win of the season. It was arguably the best performance of the season from the Kings whose goalkeeper Anisur Rahman Zico also starred in between the posts by making three penalty saves, one of which was scored on the rebound during Easa Ismail's equalizer, while the other was retaken and saved again with a dive to his left.

On 17 May 2020, The BFF executive committee, following an emergency meeting, declared the 12th edition of the league abandoned, scrapping promotion and relegation while canceling the Independence Cup from the calendar as a precaution to combat the spread of coronavirus in the country. On 10 June 2020, Bashundhra Kings released their Costa Rican World-Cupper Daniel Colindres after a nearly two-year stint with the club.

On 5 August 2020, Bashundhara Kings announced their new signing Robson Azevedo da Silva for the AFC Cup and forthcoming football season as the Brazilian winger is all set to join the Bangladesh side on loan from Fluminense FC for a year. On 21 August 2020, Midfielder Jonathan da Silveira Fernandes, better known as Fernandes, joined Bashundhara Kings who last played for Brazilian top-tier outfit Botafogo.

On 10 September 2020, Kings' journey in their debut AFC Cup campaign ended after just a single match. Kings took pole position in Group E with a 5-1 thrashing of TC Sports of Maldives in their opening fixture on 11 March, but the Bangladesh giants' campaign stalled when coronavirus spread throughout the continent, forcing the AFC to reschedule the remaining group matches at centralised venues before its cancellation.

Current squad

Pre-season and friendlies

Sheikh Kamal International Club Cup

Group stage

Group B

Friendly

Competition

Overview

Federation Cup

Group stage

Group B

Knockout phase

AFC Cup

Group stage

Group E

Premier League

League table

Results summary

Results by round

Matches

Statistics

Goalscorers

Source: Matches

References

External links
 Bashundhara Kings official site

Bashundhara Kings
Association football clubs established in 2013
Football clubs in Bangladesh
Sport in Bangladesh
Dhaka
2013 establishments in Bangladesh
2019 in Bangladeshi football
2020 in Bangladeshi football